Save the Last Chance is a song written by Walt Aldridge and Robert Byrne, and recorded by American country music artist Johnny Lee. It was released in April 1985 as the lead single from the album Keep Me Hangin' On. The song reached number 12 on the Billboard Hot Country Singles & Tracks chart and number 12 on the Canadian RPM Country Tracks chart.

Chart performance

References

1985 singles
1985 songs
Johnny Lee (singer) songs
Songs written by Walt Aldridge
Songs written by Robert Byrne (songwriter)
Warner Records singles